Vachaspati (pronounced Vāchaspati, meaning Lord of speech) is a rāgam in Carnatic music (musical scale of South Indian classical music). It is the 64th melakarta rāgam in the 72 melakarta rāgam system. It is known as Bhushāvati according to the Muthuswami Dikshitar school. It was borrowed into Hindustani music, like many other ragas from Carnatic rāgams.

Structure and Lakshana 

It is the 4th rāgam in the 11th chakra Rudra. The mnemonic name is Rudra-Bhu. The mnemonic phrase is sa ri gu mi pa dhi ni. Its  structure (ascending and descending scale) is as follows (see swaras in Carnatic music for details on below notation and terms):
: 
: 

It is a sampoorna rāgam - a rāgam that has all seven swaras (notes). It is the  equivalent of Harikambhoji, which is the 28th  scale.

Janya rāgams 
It has many janya rāgams (derived scales) associated with it, out of which Bhooshavali and Saraswathi are popular. See List of janya rāgams for all scales associated with Vachaspati.

Popular compositions 
Vachaspati is close to Kalyani (which is 65th melakarta) and differs only in the nishādham. Still, this rāgam does not have many compositions. At the same time many composers have used this rāgam for composing 1 song each.

Popular compositions in this rāgam are
Pahi Jaga janani by Swathi thirunal
Kantajoodumi by Thyagaraja
Paraatparaa by Papanasam Sivan
Sahasrakara mandithe by Muthiah Bhagavatar
Ennaadu ni kripa by Patnam Subramania Iyer.
Râjarâjeswari - pada varnam by Kalyani Varadarajan

Film Songs

Language:Tamil

Janya Ragam: Saraswathi

Related rāgams 
This section covers the theoretical and scientific aspect of this rāgam.

Vachaspati's notes when shifted using Graha bhedam, yields 3 other major melakarta rāgams, namely, Charukesi, Gourimanohari and Natakapriya. Graha bhedam is the step taken in keeping the relative note frequencies same, while shifting the Shadjam to the next note in the rāgam. For further details and an illustration refer Graha bhedam of Vachaspati.

Vachaspati corresponds to the Acoustic scale in Western music.

Notes

References

Melakarta ragas